The 2020–21 Primera Divisió was the 26th season of top-tier football in Andorra. The season was initially scheduled to begin on 25 October 2020 and end in May 2021. Due to new restrictions related to the COVID-19 pandemic in Andorra, the start of the season was delayed. The season began on 29 November 2020. The league winner qualified to participate in the 2021–22 UEFA Champions League.

Inter Club d'Escaldes were the defending Primera Divisió champions.

Teams
Ordino were relegated from the Primera Divisió after finishing in last place the previous season. As Segona Divisió champions, Penya Encarnada were promoted to replace Ordino.

Regular season

League table

Results
The eight clubs will play each other twice for fourteen matches each in the regular season.

Championship and relegation rounds
Regular season records are carried over to championship and relegation rounds.

Championship round

Relegation round

Primera Divisió play-offs
The seventh-placed team (third-placed in the relegation round) from the 2020–21 Primera Divisió and the runners-up from the 2020–21 Segona Divisió played in a two-legged play-off for one place in the 2021–22 Primera Divisió.

Top scorers

See also
 2020–21 Segona Divisió
 Copa Constitució

References

External links
   

Primera Divisió seasons
Andorra
Primera Divisio